Tortug'Air S.A. was a domestic airline in Haiti, and served as Haiti's national flag carrier. The airline was founded in March 2003, and was based in Port-au-Prince. According to the airline, more than 200 people were employed with the company. Tortug' Air went out of business sometime between mid-March to August, 2015.

Tortug’ Air was part of Haiti's transportation infrastructure. Despite the country's small size, the road network is in poor condition. Thus, air transportation takes on an oversized importance for Haiti. Tortug’ Air served that need with its domestic schedule. For example, its 40 minute flight from Port-au-Prince to Jacmel could have been driven instead; but it would take approximately four hours by road.

Destinations 

Tortug’ Air served six Haitian and three international destinations. It also had charter permits for most Caribbean islands. Flights to Les Cayes were suspended in early 2012.

Fleet

References

External links 
 

2003 establishments in Haiti
Defunct airlines of Haiti
Airlines established in 2003
Airlines disestablished in 2015
2015 disestablishments in North America
Companies based in Port-au-Prince